Streptomyces nashvillensis is a bacterium species from the genus of Streptomyces which has been isolated from soil. Streptomyces nashvillensis produces tetrodecamycin and bellenamine.

See also 
 List of Streptomyces species

References

Further reading

External links
Type strain of Streptomyces nashvillensis at BacDive -  the Bacterial Diversity Metadatabase

nashvillensis
Bacteria described in 1955